Kubitschek is the German spelling of the Czech surname Kubíček. Notable people with the surname include:

 Juscelino Kubitschek (1902–1976), President of Brazil from 1956–1961
  (1873–1971), Brazilian teacher, mother of President Juscelino Kubitschek
 Sarah Kubitschek (1909–1996), Brazilian politician, wife of President Juscelino Kubitschek
  (born 1942), Brazilian politician, daughter of President Juscelino Kubitschek
 Márcia Kubitschek (1943–2000), Brazilian politician, daughter of President Juscelino Kubitschek
 Wilhelm Kubitschek (1858–1936), Austrian art historian and archaeologist
  (1895–1945), writer and folklorist from Bohemia
 Grete Kubitschek (1903–?), Austrian Olympic figure skater
 Ruth Maria Kubitschek (born 1931), Czech-born German actress
  (born 1962), Austrian politician
 Götz Kubitschek (born 1970), German far-right publisher and activist, husband of Ellen Kositza Kubitschek
 , married name Schenke then Kubitschek (born 1978), German journalist and columnist, wife of Götz Kubitschek

See also
 Juscelino Kubitschek (disambiguation), for the many places named after President of Brazil Juscelino Kubitschek
 Kubicek (disambiguation)
 Kuybyshev (disambiguation)
 Kubicki, a surname